Delirium is a progressive rock musical group, best known for the song "Jesahel".

History 

The group formed in 1969, with the name Sagittari and with a beat repertoire. The group changed its name after Ivano Fossati joined and replaced the Sagittari singer Riccardo Anselmi towards the end of 1970.  

Since their first single "Canto di Osanna" (1971), presented at the Festival di Musica d'Avanguardia e di Nuove Tendenze, the group gained an immediate success. In 1972 Delirium entered the Sanremo Music Festival with the song "Jesahel", reaching sixth place in the competition and peaking number one on the Italian hit parade. After the new single "Haum" that Delirium presented at Un disco per l'estate Fossati left the group to start a solo career. After two more albums the group disbanded in mid-1970s, until a reunion in early 2000s.

Discography

Albums
 1971 - :it:Dolce acqua (Fonit Cetra LPX 11)
 1972 - :it:Lo scemo e il villaggio (Fonit Cetra LPX 18)
 1974 - :it:Delirium III - Viaggio negli arcipelaghi del tempo (Fonit Cetra LPX 29)
 2009 - Il nome del vento (Black Widow Records, BWR 113, LP/CD)
 2015 - L'era della menzogna (Black Widow Records, BWRCD 180-2 LP/CD)

Singles
 1971 - :it:Canto di Osanna/Deliriana (Fonit Cetra SPF 31284)
 1972 - :it:Jesahel/King's Road (Fonit Cetra SPF 31293)
 1972 - :it:Haum!/Movimento II: Dubbio (Fonit Cetra SPF 31295)
 1972 - :it:Dolce acqua/Favola o storia del lago di Kriss (Fonit Cetra SPF 31297)
 1972 - :it:Treno/È l'ora (Fonit Cetra SPF 31300)
 1974 - Leôa de laôa/ Pane vero vino puro (Aguamanda AG 9002)
 1975 - Jill/ Live Love And Be Free (Aguamanda AG 9007)
 1975 - Cowboy/ Corri bambino (Fonit Cetra SPB 36)
 1975 - Signore/ Buana, The Rainbow (Fonit Cetra SPF 31313)

References

External links 

 Delirium at Discogs

Musical groups established in 1970
Italian rock music groups
Italian progressive rock groups
Musical groups from Liguria